Mou Tun-fei (May 3, 1941 - May 25, 2019) was a Chinese filmmaker known for directing the infamous 1988 horror film Men Behind the Sun.

Biography
Born on May 3, 1941 in Shandong, China, Mou's family left China for Taiwan in 1949 due to Chinese Civil War. Mou graduated from National School of Arts (now National Taiwan University of Arts) that could not even afford equipment for the students. Mou thus was forced to learn filmmaking by theory alone, mainly by watching films numerous times in theaters and identifying how many cuts the films contained. After graduation, Mou was assistant director on an anti-communist propaganda film called Give Back My Country and then directed numerous Taiwanese films in a style akin to the Italian neorealist movement. His first and second feature I don't dare to tell you (1969) and At the runway's edge (1970) were both banned by Taiwanese government, especially the latter film contained homosexual overtones.

In 1977, Mou settled in Hong Kong and joined the Shaw Brothers, his first film there being Gun, a segment in the fifth film of the Shaw’s exploitation true crime series The Criminals. While at the Shaw Brothers, he would dabble in crime (Bank Busters), romance (Melody of Love), horror (Haunted Tales) and kung-fu (A Deadly Secret). However, his most notable work for the Shaw Brothers would be Lost Souls (1980); telling the story of a group of illegal immigrants taken captive and sexually and physically abused by a gang of human traffickers, Lost Souls has often been called a brazen, vicious and outrageous exploitation film and a film that brings Pier Paolo Pasolini’s Salò, or the 120 Days of Sodom to mind.

Mou then left the Shaw Brothers to become the first director from Taiwan to work in the mainland. While working on a children’s kung fu film called Young Heroes, Mou began to hear stories about war atrocities committed by the Japanese Imperial Army during World War II. One account, of how the Japanese military had performed every manner of horrific experiment on Chinese POWs and civilians while stationed at Unit 731 in Manchuria, particularly grabbed Mou. Thus, he decided to make a film about it. Originally, he wanted to make a documentary, but he then realized that the Japanese army had destroyed or classified most of the photographs and films so he set about making a staged recreation instead. The film that resulted, a collaboration between Hong Kong and the mainland, would be the horror film Men Behind the Sun. After co-directing the hardcore pornographic film Trilogy of Lust with Julie Lee Wa-Yuet, Mou set about making a sequel to Men Behind the Sun, this time visiting the 1937 Nanjing Massacre (or Rape of Nanking) called Black Sun: The Nanking Massacre which released in 1995.

Filmography

References

External links

Interview
The Exploitation Cinema of T.F. Mou

1941 births
2019 deaths
Propaganda film directors
Film directors from Shandong
Taiwanese film directors
Hong Kong film directors
Chinese film directors
National Taiwan University of Arts alumni
Taiwanese people  from Shandong